Gary Dunn (born August 24, 1953) is a former professional football player American football defensive tackle for the Pittsburgh Steelers, where he played for 12 seasons.

Early life
Gary Dunn was born August 24, 1953 in Coral Gables, Florida. His grandfather was Bowman Foster Ashe, the first president of the University of Miami. Dunn attended Coral Gables Senior High School in Coral Gables.

College career
Dunn attended the University of Miami, where he was a standout college football players for the Miami Hurricanes.

Professional career
In 1976, Dunn was drafted by the Pittsburgh Steelers, where he a mainstay on the vaunted Steelers' defense for 12 seasons, serving as team captain four years. While with the Steelers, he was a two-time Super Bowl champion and had 18 career sacks, including of such legendary NFL Hall of Fame quarterbacks as Joe Namath, Bob Griese and Jim Kelly.

Personal
Gary Dunn is the grandson of Bowman Foster Ashe, the first president of the University of Miami, and he and his wife Caron live in Tavernier, Florida with their two children, Iris and Eddie. They own Oceanview Inn and Pub in Islamorada, Florida.

References

1953 births
Living people
American football defensive tackles
Miami Hurricanes football players
Pittsburgh Steelers players
Sportspeople from Coral Gables, Florida
Players of American football from Florida
People from Monroe County, Florida
Ed Block Courage Award recipients